is a 1980 Japanese television series. The series was cancelled after 19 episodes.

Cast
Kaoru Yumi as Michiko Katsura
Mihoko Fujita as Kanako Matsubara
Hiroko Isayama as Yoshie Ishida (episodes 1-4)
Akiko Hyūga as Tamami Aizawa
Reiko Itsuki as Yuriko Mine
Nancy Cheney as Anna Hida
Hoan Yuki as Jun (episodes 1-13)
Yūki Mizuhara as Hikari Haruno (from episode 5)
Aya Fujieda as Maki Asaka (from episode 14)
Masumi Okada as Chief Detective Yūji Seki

References

1980 Japanese television series debuts
1980 Japanese television series endings
1980s Japanese television series
Japanese crime television series
Japanese detective television drama series